American fried rice is a Thai fried rice dish with "American" side ingredients like fried chicken, ham, hot dogs, raisins, and ketchup. Other ingredients like pineapples and croutons are optional.

History
The origin of American fried rice has a number of tales, anecdotes, urban legend, and related stories.  Most of those stories are related to either American troops or their culture. Currently, there are three major tales and hypotheses about the origins of American fried rice:

See also

 American cuisine
 Chinese fried rice
 Fried rice
 Thai fried rice

References

American fusion cuisine
American rice dishes
Fried rice
Malaysian rice dishes
Thai fusion cuisine
Thai rice dishes
Chinese fusion cuisine